A coin test (or a bell metal resonance) is a medical diagnostic test used to test for a punctured lung. A punctured lung can cause air or fluid to leak into the pleural cavity, leading to, for example, pneumothorax or hydrothorax.

In a coin test, a coin held against the chest is tapped by another coin on the side where the puncture is suspected. A stethoscope is placed on the back to listen to breath sounds and the sound of the coins. If a tinkling sound is heard, it is likely that air or fluid has found its way into the pleural cavity.

References 
 K. George, Matthew, Preparation Manual for Undergraduates of Medicine
 Bellmetal resonance in Stedman's Medical Dictionary at Drugs.com

Physical examination